Saulo Mendonça Ribeiro Filho (born July 2, 1974), brother of the equally famed Xande Ribeiro, is a 6th-degree black belt in Brazilian Jiu-Jitsu (BJJ). After earning a black belt in Judo, he began his training of Brazilian Jiu-Jitsu in Rio de Janeiro under Royler Gracie, the son of Hélio Gracie, at the famous Gracie Humaitá.

Saulo received his black belt in BJJ on November 27, 1995. Less than two years later, he won his first MMA fight. He also won the World Jiu-Jitsu Championship five times, in an equal amount of varying weight classes.

Biography

Saulo Ribeiro was born in Manaus, Brazil on July 2, 1974.  At the age of 15 and already a Judo practitioner, Saulo started training Jiu Jitsu as a way to improve his Judo game by learning submissions.  He moved away from home in December 1991 and headed to school in Rio de Janeiro.  Rio de Janeiro is where Saulo began his training under Royler Gracie at the legendary Gracie Humaitá.  Shortly after receiving his black belt from Royler Gracie on November 27, 1995, Saulo won the Brazilian Nationals Lightweight Title.

University of Jiu Jitsu

Alongside brother Xande, Saulo ran the University of Jiu Jitsu (closed as of 2020) in San Diego, California, a school that focuses as much on the traditional and character aspects of students as technical and practical ability. The school opened in Feb 10, 2007, and is currently the headquarters of the Ribeiro Jiu-Jitsu Association with over 50 affiliates world-wide.

Saulo is also the author of the book Jiu Jitsu University, a detailed training manual that presents techniques for each belt level from white to black belt. Despite being released in 2008, the book is still consistently cited as one of the best written instructionals available for Brazilian Jiu-Jitsu. In addition, he teaches in various instructional DVD releases, like the "Brazilian Jiu-Jitsu Revolution" series which was first released in 2004.

Instructorship

Saulo, through the Ribeiro Jiu-Jitsu Association, is said to have over 2000 students, and has graduated over 60 black belts. Saulo has also been coach to many high-level grappling competitors such as World Jiu-Jitsu Champion Rafael Lovato Jr., and MMA Fighter Diego Sanchez, who trained out of The Arena (MMA) gym in San Diego until Sanchez returned to his home state of New Mexico.

Retirement and return

The 2009 ADCC in Barcelona would be Saulo's last, and saw him, to the surprise of many, competing in the +99 kg weight category. He defeated Kouji Kanechika and World Jiu-Jitsu Champion Romulo Barral before losing to the much larger Fabrício Werdum in the semifinal on judges' decision. After losing on another judges' decision in the third-place dispute to Jeff Monson, Saulo announced his retirement from professional jiu-jitsu and grappling competition.

Less than a year later, Ribeiro announced he would be competing for the first time in the International Masters and Seniors tournament. He succeeded in winning his weight division, along with the team trophy for Gracie Humaita, who had lost it to Gracie Barra the previous year.

On August 9, 2014, Ribeiro fought Rodrigo Medeiros in a grappling match in Metamoris IV.  The fight ended in a draw.

On January 31, 2022, Ribeiro was inducted as part of the inaugural class of the ADCC Hall of Fame for his achievements in the sport.

Mixed martial arts record

|-
| Win
|align=center| 2–1
| Jason Ireland
| Submission (Rear Naked Choke)
| TFC 5 - Fightzone 5
| 
|align=center|-
|align=center|- 
|Toledo, Ohio
|
|-
| Loss
|align=center| 1–1
| Yuki Kondo
| TKO (Punches) 
| C2K - Colosseum 2000
| 
|align=center| 1
|align=center| 0:22
| Japan
|
|-
| Win
|align=center| 1–0
| Carlos Lopes
| Submission (Rear Naked Choke)
| CDL - Carioca de Freestyle
| 
|align=center|-
|align=center|- 
|Brazil
|

Instructor lineage
Kanō Jigorō → Tomita Tsunejirō → Mitsuyo "Count Koma" Maeda → Carlos Gracie → Helio Gracie → Royler Gracie → Saulo Ribeiro

See also
List of Brazilian Jiu-Jitsu practitioners

References 

 International Federation of Brazilian Jiu-Jitsu. World Championship, Results. ibjjf.com.

External links
Ribeiro Jiu-Jitsu | Ribeiro Brothers | BJJ Association - Home
Saulo & Xande Ribeiro's University of Jiu Jitsu
Saulo Ribeiro Bio
Academia Gracie Jiu-Jitsu

Brazilian practitioners of Brazilian jiu-jitsu
People awarded a black belt in Brazilian jiu-jitsu
Brazilian male judoka
1974 births
Living people
Brazilian male mixed martial artists
Mixed martial artists utilizing Brazilian jiu-jitsu
Mixed martial artists utilizing judo
Sportspeople from San Diego
People from Manaus
World Brazilian Jiu-Jitsu Championship medalists
World No-Gi Brazilian Jiu-Jitsu Championship medalists
IBJJF Hall of Fame inductees
Sportspeople from Amazonas (Brazilian state)
ADCC Hall of Fame inductees